The 2010–11 Biathlon World Cup - World Cup 3 was held in Pokljuka, Slovenia, from 16 December until 19 December 2010.

Schedule of events 
The time schedule of the event stands below

Medal winners

Men

Women

Mixed

Achievements
 Best performance for all time

 , 2nd place in Individual
 , 6th place in Individual
 , 17th place in Individual
 , 31st place in Individual and Sprint
 , 45th place in Individual
 , 49th place in Individual
 , 84th place in Individual
 , 99th place in Individual
 , 6th place in Sprint
 , 22nd place in Sprint
 , 54th place in Sprint
 , 6th place in Individual
 , 21st place in Individual
 , 22nd place in Individual
 , 23rd place in Individual
 , 33rd place in Individual and 22nd place in Sprint
 , 57th place in Individual
 , 5th place in Sprint
 , 60th place in Sprint

 First World Cup race

 , 84th place in Sprint
 , 98th place in Sprint
 , 59th place in Sprint

References 

- World Cup 3, 2010-11 Biathlon World Cup
Biathlon World Cup - World Cup 3, 2010-11
Biathlon competitions in Slovenia
December 2010 sports events in Europe